José Álvarez de Paz (19 November 1935 in Noceda del Bierzo, León, Spain – 16 February 2021 in Baiona, Pontevedra, Spain) was a Spanish labor lawyer and politician who served as a Deputy and MEP. He was one of the names that were on the blacklists to retaliate if the coup d'état of 1981 had triumphed.

References

1935 births
2021 deaths
People from El Bierzo
Members of the Congress of Deputies (Spain)
Members of the European Parliament for Spain